State Route 340 (SR 340) is a short state highway in Lyon County, Nevada. The route covers a portion of Bridge Street in the city of Yerington.

Route description

SR 340 begins at the intersection of Bridge Street and State Route 339 just west of the city limits and east of Yerington Mine. From there, the highway heads east on Bridge Street, immediately crossing over the Walker River. The route passes through farm areas and just north of the Yerington Paiute Indian Colony as it heads into more populated areas of the city.

History
State Route 340 was established on July 1, 1976.

Major intersections

See also

References

340
Transportation in Lyon County, Nevada